The Iglesia de la Santa Cruz is a parish church in Zona Romántica, Puerto Vallarta, in the Mexican state of Jalisco. It is dedicated to the holy cross, whose feast is on 3 May with a celebration named Fiesta de las Cruces. The holy cross is also the patron saint of the masons, who go on pilgrimage to the church on that day. The construction started in 1954.

References

External links

 

Buildings and structures in Puerto Vallarta
Churches in Mexico
Zona Romántica